Richard Williams (c. 1654 – September 1692), of Cabalfa, Clyro, Radnorshire, was a Welsh politician.

He was a Member (MP) of the Parliament of England for Radnorshire in 1677, 1685 and 1690–1692, for Breconshire in 1679 and 1681, and for New Radnor Boroughs in 1689.

References

1654 births
1692 deaths
17th-century Welsh politicians
People from Radnorshire
English MPs 1661–1679
English MPs 1679
English MPs 1681
English MPs 1685–1687
English MPs 1689–1690
English MPs 1690–1695